Ikboljon Kholdarov (born 8 March 1997) is an Uzbekistani boxer. He won the gold medal in the men's 64 kg event at the 2018 Asian Games.

In 2017, he won the gold medal in the men's 64 kg event at the Asian Amateur Boxing Championships.

At the 2017 AIBA World Boxing Championships, he won the silver medal in the light welterweight event.

References

External links 
 

Living people
1997 births
Uzbekistani male boxers
Asian Games medalists in boxing
Asian Games gold medalists for Uzbekistan
Boxers at the 2018 Asian Games
Medalists at the 2018 Asian Games
People from Andijan
AIBA World Boxing Championships medalists
Light-welterweight boxers
21st-century Uzbekistani people